HMS Beaver was an Acheron-class destroyer of the Royal Navy that served during the First World War and was sold for breaking in 1921. She was the ninth Royal Navy ship to be named Beaver, after the mammal of the same name.

Construction
She was ordered under the 1910-11 shipbuilding programme from Parsons, with construction subcontracted to William Denny & Brothers of Dumbarton. Beaver was laid down on 18 October 1910, was launched on 6 October 1911 and commissioned in November 1912. She and her sister-ship Badger were completed with geared steam turbines for evaluation purposes and were known as "Parsons Specials".

Pennant numbers

Operational history

Pre-war

Beaver served with the First Destroyer Flotilla from 1911. She was stranded at Great Yarmouth in December 1912, but was not badly damaged. With her flotilla, she joined the British Grand Fleet in 1914 on the outbreak of the First World War.

The Battle of Heligoland Bight
She was present on 28 August 1914 at the Battle of Heligoland Bight, detached from the First Destroyer Flotilla along with Jackal, Badger and Sandfly. She shared in the prize money for the engagement.

Home Waters service
During the War, the Canadian John Moreau Grant (later the first commanding officer of HMCS Royal Roads) served in Beaver, eventually becoming her first lieutenant. Beaver was employed in patrolling the English Channel as far as the Hook of Holland, and escorted hospital ships to and from France. Grant's oral testimony reports an action against an unknown submarine during this period.

Mediterranean service
In April 1918 she was ordered to the Mediterranean, where she was employed in convoy and anti-submarine work. Based at Brindisi, Italy, she participated in the attempted blockade of Austro-Hungarian submarines in the Adriatic. In October 1918 she took part in the bombardment of Durazzo (now Durrës, Albania). When the Ottoman Empire signed the Armistice of Mudros on 30 October 1918, Beaver ferried troops to the Dardanelles and entered the Sea of Marmara before proceeding to Constantinople. From Constantinople, she sailed to Odessa, where civil order was breaking down amidst occupation by both the Imperial German army and the White Russian Army. She sailed up the Danube and in December 1918 visited Sevastopol, where the Russian Black Sea Fleet lay abandoned and in a poor state of repair. Some political refugees were rescued from Odessa.

Decommissioning and fate
In common with most of her class, she was laid up after the First World War and, in May 1921, she was sold for breaking.

References

Acheron-class destroyers of the Royal Navy
Ships built on the River Clyde
1911 ships
World War I destroyers of the United Kingdom